Pegs'n Co was a French software company that developed a traditional animation software package called Pegs, and is now part of Canadian company Toon Boom Animation. It was based in Paris, France. Pegs was used for several animated feature films, shorts, and television series, and it powered the French animation industry until the 2000s as it was used by studios like Millimages, Alphanim, and Animage, but it was also used by studios in other countries, most notably Saerom Animation, CineGroupe, and Mike Young Productions. In total, Pegs was used by over 100 studios worldwide.

History
In 1991, Pixibox, a French animation studio, decided to develop its own ink & paint and compositing tools in order to make one of the first fully digital animated series, Peter et Sonia. The first version of Pegs was released under the name Pixiscan. In 1994, Pixibox began to market the product, and the first Pegs licenses were sold.

In 1997, following the acquisition of the company by Humanoids Group, Mediapegs was set up in order to handle the development and licensing of Pegs. In 1999, a new version of Pegs for Windows NT was launched, which allowed users to animate with both bitmaps and vectors. In September 2003, after two uneasy years for the animation market, Mediapegs was forced to file for bankruptcy.

After Mediapegs closed, four former employees grew increasingly concerned about the demise of Pegs and the future of professionals using the technology. Bolstered by the support of many within the animation industry, they decided to create a new company called Pegs'n Co. In June 2004, a new version of Pegs was released, and Pegs'n Co enjoyed renewed success, taking part in Annecy's festival with a new version every year, and being involved in feature films and numerous international shows.

In 2006, Toon Boom acquired Pegs'n Co as part of its growth strategy. Since the acquisition, the software has not been updated and can no longer be purchased.

Filmography

 64 Zoo Lane
 Aida of the Trees
 Archibald the Koala
 The Avengers: United They Stand
 Babar (season 6)
 Bad Dog
 The Baskervilles
 Bamboo Bears
 The Bellflower Bunnies
 Billy the Cat
 Black Mor's Island
 Blazing Dragons
 The Boy
 Braceface
 Caillou (seasons 1-3)
 Captain Red Beard
 Carnivale
 Cédric
 Chris Colorado
 Clifford the Big Red Dog
 Cosmic Cowboys
 Daria
 Dora the Explorer
 Dr. Zitbag's Transylvania Pet Shop
 Dragon Flyz
 Dragon Tales
 Duck Ugly
 Esprit fantômes
 Ethelbert the Tiger
 Famille Pirate
 Fat Dog Mendoza
 Fire Quest
 Fly Tales
 Galactik Football
 Gargantua
 Go, Diego! Go!
 A Goofy Movie
 Heavy Metal 2000
 Hey Arnold!
 How the Toys Saved Christmas
 Iron Nose
 Jack and Marcel
 Jasper the Penguin
 Jim Button
 Kangoo
 Kangoo Juniors
 Kaput and Zösky
 KaBlam! ("Randall Flan's Incredible Big Top" and "JetCat")
 Kid Clones
 The Kids from Room 402
 Kirikou and the Wild Beasts
 La Princesse du Nil
 Les Misérables
 Les Pastagums
 Lion of Oz
 Little Dracula
 Little Hippo
 Little Vampire
 Lucky and Zorba
 Marcelino, pan y vino
 Marsupilami
 Mega Babies
 Milo
 Mot
 My Gym Partner's a Monkey
 NASCAR Racers
 The Neverending Story
 Nick & Perry
 Oscar's Orchestra
 Old Tom
 Oswald
 Pablo the Little Red Fox
 Papyrus
 Peter et Sonia
 Petzi und seine Freunde
 Pigeon Boy
 Planet Grabo
 Poil de carotte
 Popetown
 Prince of Atlantis
 Princess Sissi
 Prudence Petitpas
 Random! Cartoons ("Girls on the GO!" and "Thom Cat")
 Ratz
 Rupert (season 3)
 Sagwa, the Chinese Siamese Cat
 The Secret World of Santa Claus
 Silverwing
 Sky Dancers
 Sophie's Misfortunes
 SOS Croco
 Space Goofs
 Spirou
 Spirou et Fantasio
 Stanley
 Student Bodies
 Talis
 T'choupi
 Titanic: The Legend Goes On
 Tom et Sheenah
 Totò Sapore and the magical story of pizza
 The Triplets
 Tupu
 Undergrads
 The Wacky World of Tex Avery
 Watch My Chops
 The Way Things Work
 What's with Andy?
 Winx Club
 W.I.T.C.H.
 Woofy
 Wombat City
 X-DuckX
 Zoe and Charlie

See also
 Toon Boom Animation, which acquired Pegs'n Co and its Pegs package
 USAnimation
 Adobe Flash
 List of 2D animation software

References

External links

2D animation software
Defunct software companies of France
Defunct companies of France
Software companies of France
Software companies established in 1991
Software companies disestablished in 2009
French companies disestablished in 2009
French companies established in 1991